Qasemabad-e Bala may refer to:
 Qasemabad-e Bala, Fars
 Qasemabad-e Bala, Gilan